The Wind Carpet or Kaze no jûtan is a 2003 Iranian drama film directed by Kamal Tabrizi.

Plot 
A Japanese female designer a Carpet she wants to show at the Nakayama Carnival, Orders weavers in Isfahan to weave, but her death leaves the action unfinished. her husband and daughter go to Iran to finish the half-finished work and become the guests of a family in Isfahan...

Cast 
 Reza Kianian
 Rentarō Mikuni
 Youki Kudoh
 Hushang Harirchiyan
 Shirin Bina
 Miyu Yagyu
 Maryam Boubani
 Fereydoon Heydari
 Mohammadreza Khorshidi
 Reza Nabavi
 Takaaki Enoki
 Yuri Masuda
 Farboud Ahmadjoo
 Fariba Kamran
 Hossein Ghgiabi
 Abbas Ahmadi Motlagh
 Mehdi Tarokh

References 
 The Wind Carpet on Cpersia News

External links

2003 films
Japanese multilingual films
Iranian multilingual films
2000s Japanese-language films
2000s Persian-language films
Films directed by Kamal Tabrizi
2003 multilingual films
2000s Japanese films